The 2007 Bracknell Forest Borough Council election took place on 3 May 2007, to elect all 42 councillors in 18 wards for Bracknell Forest Borough Council in England.  The election was held on the same day as other local elections in England as part of the 2007 United Kingdom local elections.  The Conservative Party increased its majority at the expense of both the Labour Party and the Liberal Democrats, the latter losing its only seat.  This was the only all-out council election where the far-right British National Party put up a candidate.

Ward results
An asterisk (*) denotes an incumbent councillor standing for re-election

Ascot

Binfield with Warfield

Bullbrook

Central Sandhurst

College Town

Crown Wood

Crowthorne

Great Hollands North

Great Hollands South

Hanworth

Harmans Water

Little Sandhurst and Wellington

Old Bracknell

Owlsmoor

Priestwood & Garth

Warfield Harvest Ride

Wildridings & Central

Winkfield & Cranbourne

By-elections

Hanworth

Owlsmoor

References

Bracknell Forest Borough Council elections
Bracknell